Sindh Awami Ittehad, was a political party established in 2012 by Liaquat Ali Jatoi in Sindh, Pakistan. The party later merged with Pakistan Muslim League (N).

References

Political parties established in 2012
Political parties in Pakistan
Pakistan Muslim League (N)
2012 establishments in Pakistan